Lyon Mountain is a  mountain located in Clinton County, New York, the county’s  high point. It is named for Nathaniel Lyon, an early settler of the area who moved from Vermont in 1803 and died circa 1850. The mountain is within New York's Adirondack Park.

Lyon Mountain Mountain Fire Observation Station, built in 1917, still stands atop the mountain, and can be accessed by hikers.

Drainage
The mountain lies within the watershed of the Saint Lawrence River, and drains into the Gulf of Saint Lawrence. It’s northeast slopes  drain into Chazy Lake, the source of the Great Chazy River, then Lake Champlain, which drains into Canada's Richelieu River, thence into the Saint Lawrence River. The southeast slopes drain into Smithkill Brook, thence into True Brook, the Saranac River, and Lake Champlain. The southwest end of Lyon drains into Cold Brook, thence into the North Branch of the Saranac River. The west slopes of Lyon drain into Standish Brook, thence into Middle Kiln Brook, Upper and Lower Chateaugay Lakes, the source of the Chateaugay River, which drains into the Saint Lawrence River in Canada. The northwest slopes of Lyon drain into Separator Brook, thence into Upper Chateaugay Lake.

History

A fire lookout station was established in April 1910, without a fire tower, as the summit of Lyon Mountain was bare at that time. In 1917, the New York State Conservation Commission erected a  Aermotor LS40 steel fire lookout tower on the mountain. The tower ceased fire lookout operations at the end of the 1988 fire season. It was officially closed in early 1989, when the New York State Department of Environmental Conservation determined that airplanes were more effective for spotting fires than fire towers. The tower and surrounding land belonged to timber company Domtar until January 2005, when Domtar sold  of its holdings around Lyon Mountain to The Nature Conservancy; the land has since been sold to New York State.

See also 
 List of mountains in New York

References 

Mountains of Clinton County, New York
Geography of Clinton County, New York